Dârjiu is a commune in Harghita County, Romania. It lies in the Székely Land, an ethno-cultural region in eastern Transylvania.

The toponym "Székelyderzs" was first mentioned as "De ers" in a papal list of tithes taken in 1334. In 1525, it was recorded as Ders, while in 1760, it was already mentioned by its modern Hungarian name as  Székely Derzs.

The first written mention of the toponym Székelyderzs as De Ers is from a list of papal tithes taken in 1334. In  1525, it was mentioned as Ders, while in 1760, the modern form of its Hungarian name was already used as Székely Derzs. The name Derzs is thought to be from the Old Bulgar.

The commune is composed of two villages:

Dârjiu / Székelyderzs
Mujna / Székelymuzsna

Demographics
At the 2011 census, the commune had a population of 1,036; out of them, 92% were Hungarian, 6% were Roma and 1.4% were Romanian. 61% of the commune population are Unitarian, 20% are Reformed and 7% are Roman Catholic.

History

The village is home to the Dârjiu fortified church, a 13th-century fortified Unitarian Church, which is on UNESCO's World Heritage List.

Unitariansm was an official religion in Transylvania from the 1583 Medgyes parliament. The first bishop was Ferenc Dávid, a local Hungarian-speaking Saxon. The first appointed ruler of Transylvania was the Unitarian John II Sigismund Zápolya, son of the Hungarian king John Zápolya (1526-1541).

The villages were historically part of the Székely Land region of Transylvania province. They belonged to Udvarhelyszék district until the administrative reform of Transylvania in 1876, when they fell within the Udvarhely County in the Kingdom of Hungary. After the Treaty of Trianon of 1920, they became part of Romania and fell within Odorhei County during the interwar period. In 1940, the second Vienna Award granted the Northern Transylvania to Hungary and the villages were held by Hungary until 1944. After Soviet occupation, the Romanian administration returned and the commune became officially part of Romania in 1947. Between 1952 and 1960, the commune fell within the Magyar Autonomous Region, between 1960 and 1968 the Mureș-Magyar Autonomous Region. In 1968, the province was abolished, and since then, the commune has been part of Harghita County.

Heartland of Unitarianism 
Between 80,000 and 100,000 Unitarians live in the geographical region of Transylvania, mostly between Sighişoara and Odorheiu Secuiesc, more or less around Dârjiu. Further east, Hungarians are Roman Catholics with Calvinist enclaves e.g. in the former Háromszék County while the former Csík County is solidly Roman Catholic.

The murals of the Unitarian church show the legend of Ladislaus I of Hungary. When the Cumans broke into Kingdom of Hungary, Ladislaus, still a Duke, along with his cousin  (King Salamon I) rode against them and freed a girl believed to be daughter of an aristocrat from a Cuman. Unhappily enough, the girl did not support this act of the future Saint.

Further murals in the region are to be found at Unitarian churches in Mugeni, Crăciunel (Karácsonyfalva) and smaller ones in Rugăneşti (Rugonfalva) and Cristuru Secuiesc (Székelykeresztúr). Saxon murals are most significant in Mălâncrav (Szászszentlászló).

Twinning 

 Darány, Hungary

The local Unitarian community has relationship with the Unitarian Universalist Church in Cherry Hill, New Jersey, USA.

See also
 List of castles in Romania
 Tourism in Romania
 Villages with fortified churches in Transylvania
Old Transylvanian churches with murals
Ghelința, St. Emeric Church: 13th-century murals
Laslea, Mălâncrav church: early 14th- and 15th-century murals
Church on the Hill (Sighișoara), 14th-16th century murals

External links 
 The Unitarian fortified church

Gallery

References 

Communes in Harghita County
Localities in Transylvania
Villages with fortified churches in Transylvania
Székely communities